Andrés Jaime Palma Irarrázaval (born 21 July 1955) is a Chilean economist and former politician.

External links
 BCN Profile

1955 births
Living people
Chilean people
University of Chile alumni
Christian Democratic Party (Chile) politicians